Elizaveta (Liza) Levina is a Russian and American mathematical statistician. She is the Vijay Nair Collegiate Professor of Statistics at the University of Michigan, and is known for her work in high-dimensional statistics, including covariance estimation, graphical models, statistical network analysis, and nonparametric statistics.

Academic biography
Levina completed her undergraduate studies in mathematics at Saint Petersburg State University in Russia in 1994. After earning a master's degree in mathematics from the University of Utah in 1997, she completed her PhD in statistics in 2002 from the University of California, Berkeley. Her dissertation, supervised by Peter J. Bickel, was Statistical Issues in Texture Analysis.

Levina joined the faculty of Department of Statistics at University of Michigan after completing her PhD in 2002. She was promoted to associate professor in 2009 and to full professor in 2014.  She has been serving as the department's PhD program director since 2012 and also associate chair since 2014.  She is also affiliated faculty at the Michigan Institute for Data Science (MIDAS) and the Center for the Study of Complex Systems.

Recognition
Levina received the American Statistical Association Gottfried E. Noether Young Scholar Award in 2010 for her contributions to nonparametric statistics.

She was elected to the International Statistical Institute in 2011. In 2016, she was elected as a Fellow of the American Statistical Association and as a Fellow of the Institute of Mathematical Statistics (IMS) .

She was awarded the Vijay Nair Collegiate Professorship in 2017.

She was an invited speaker at the 2018 International Congress of Mathematicians, speaking in the section on Probability and Statistics. She has been chosen as a 2019 Medallion Lecturer for the IMS.

Professor Liza Levina is a “Thomson-ISI highly cited” researcher.

She received University of Michigan Distinguished Faculty Achievement Award in 2019.  This honor is awarded university-wide to five senior faculty members annually.

Family

Levina's husband, Edward Ionides, is also a professor of statistics at the University of Michigan.  They have three children.

References

External links
Home page

Year of birth missing (living people)
Living people
American statisticians
Russian statisticians
Women statisticians
Saint Petersburg State University alumni
University of Utah alumni
University of Michigan faculty
Elected Members of the International Statistical Institute
Fellows of the American Statistical Association
Fellows of the Institute of Mathematical Statistics
Mathematical statisticians